Hayu (stylized as hayu. and pronounced "hey U"  ) is a subscription-based video streaming service owned by NBCUniversal, a division of Comcast, introduced in 2016. Hayu is available in the United Kingdom, Ireland, India, Italy, Albania, Australia, Denmark, Iceland, Sweden, Norway, Finland, Canada, the Netherlands, Belgium, Luxembourg, Hong Kong, Philippines, Spain, Germany, Singapore, Portugal and Poland. The service features on demand reality television episodes of series premiering day-and-date (or day-after) as the US, mainly programming originally aired by NBCU's networks Bravo and E!.

Programming
 Below Deck
 Below Deck Mediterranean
 Below Deck Sailing Yacht
 Married To Medicine (Atlanta, Houston, Los Angeles)
 Big Rich (Texas, Atlanta)
 Keeping Up with the Kardashians 
 The Real Housewives (Dallas, Lagos, Melbourne, Cheshire, Johannesburg, Auckland, Toronto, D.C., Dubai, Vancouver, Miami, Durban, Potomac, Beverley Hills, Sydney, Atlanta, New Jersey, Orange County, New York City & Salt Lake City)
 Love & Hip Hop (Atlanta, Miami)
 Million Dollar Listing
 Top Chef
 Family Karma
 I Am Cait
 Thicker Than Water
 Flipping Out
 Jerseylicious
 Shahs of Sunset
 The Millionaire Matchmaker
 Bad Girls Club
 Don't Be Tardy
 Vanderpump Rules
 Rich Kids of Beverly Hills
 Pretty Wild
 Botched
 The Bi Life

References

External links

Video on demand services
IOS software
NBCUniversal
Android (operating system) software
Internet properties established in 2016